The All People's Party (APP) is a political party in Namibia.

Registered with the Electoral Commission of Namibia in January 2008, the party was initially made up primarily of former members of the Congress of Democrats and SWAPO political parties. Among the initial leaders were Chairperson Ignatius Shixwameni and Deputy Chairperson Stephanus Swartbooi.

Ignatius Shixwameni, who had led the party since 2009, died on 10 November 2021.

Policies
Prior to the 2009 general election, the party sought to eliminate poverty in Namibia within five years and informal settlements in ten years. In a political forum prior to the 2009 election, party representative Lena Nakatana stated that the human rights of LGBT Namibians should be respected because of their equal citizenship.

Electoral history

Presidential elections

National Assembly elections

2015 local and regional elections 
In the 2015 Namibian local and regional elections the APP won 4 council seats.

2014 general election
In the 2014 Namibian general election the APP gained 2 seats in parliament.

2009 general election

In the 2009 Namibian general election campaign, the party leadership consisted of President Shixwameni, Vice President Reinhold Madala Nauyoma, Secretary General Mukuve Marcellus Mudumbi and National chairman Herbert Shixwameni. All four of which were activists in the Namibia National Students Organisation.

In October 2009, the party and the Rehoboth Ratepayers' Association, a local political party in Rehoboth in the Hardap Region, agreed to a collective agreement to cooperate in the 2009 general elections. The leader of the association, Lukas de Klerk, said it was a way for Rehoboth to have representation in the Namibian National Assembly. De Klerk was listed at the sixth position for the party on the list for National Assembly.

Party President Ignatius Shixwameni was elected to the National Assembly with the party. The party garnered 10,795 (1.3 percent) of votes for the National Assembly. The party joined with other opposition parties to contest the conduct and outcome of the 2009 National Assembly election, bringing forth a legal challenge aiming to declare the election null and void.

2004 local and regional elections

Although the party was founded after the 2004 Namibian local and regional elections it participated in the regional by-election in the Tobias Hainyeko constituency in October 2008. However, it received only 164 votes, compared to 5,526 for SWAPO. The other political parties contesting the election withdrew two days prior to the election.

See also

 List of political parties in Namibia
 Manifesto of the APP

References

Political parties established in 2008
Political parties in Namibia
2008 establishments in Namibia
Socialist parties in Namibia